Stupid, Stupid Man  is an Australian television comedy which originally aired on TV1. It is set in the office of the fictional men's magazine COQ (Chap's Own Quarterly), parodying such men's magazines as FHM and Ralph. The first season began broadcasting on 14 November 2006, and a second season began on 11 December 2007. On 29 January 2008, the final episode of the show aired.

Plot
Stupid, Stupid Man centres on the lives of the four men on the editorial team and the women who work with them. Carl Van Dyke (Wayne Hope) is the editor whose roots and aspirations lie with real news journalism. Nick Driscoll (Matthew Newton) is the features writer who is smart and very charming but lazy. Dave Muir (Bob Franklin) is the self-doubting advice columnist. Tina Carmody (Sophie Katinis) is the smart and sexy personal assistant, who understands the paradoxical world of men's magazines, and is an astute judge of character with a disarming ability to speak her mind. Ross Hampton (Chris Leaney) is the shy, aspirational copy boy, who still lives with his mum. Anne Cassidy (Leah Vandenberg) is the stylish and successful publisher who knows more about men she works with than they know about themselves.

Episode guide

Season 1 (2006)
 Episode 1: "Prophylaxis" (14 November 2006)
 Episode 2: "A Very Very Private Function" (14 November 2006)
 Episode 3: "The Reunion" (21 November 2006)
 Episode 4: "The Cobra" (21 November 2006)
 Episode 5: "The Guest" (28 November 2006)
 Episode 6: "Integrity" (28 November 2006)
 Episode 7: "The Mole" (5 December 2006)
 Episode 8: "Full Circle" (5 December 2006)

Guest stars include Georgie Parker, Tasma Walton, Anne Fulwood, Barry Otto, Sarah Chalmers, Greg Matthews, Natalie Bassingthwaighte, Kristian Schmid, Felix Williamson, Richard Carter, Kate Bell and Leo Sayer.

Season 2 (2007–2008)
 Episode 1: "Appearances are Everything" (11 December 2007)
 Episode 2: "The Boyfriend" (18 December 2007)
 Episode 3: "The Black Dog" (25 December 2007)
 Episode 4: "Morale" (1 January 2008)
 Episode 5: "The Return" (8 January 2008)
 Episode 6: "Fifteenth Floor" (15 January 2008)
 Episode 7: "Coqtober" (22 January 2008)
 Episode 8: "London Calling" (29 January 2008)

Guest stars include Stephen Curry, Marcus Graham, Jacqueline McKenzie, Richard Carter, Terry Serio, Leo Sayer, Maria Venuti, Emily Taheny, Nicholas Zefaris, Jordan Raskopoulos, Helen Thomson, Christopher Parson, Josh Clabburn, Courtney-Jane Polder, Rachel Van Dyke and Cariba Heine.

See also
List of Australian television series

References

External links
 Official site
 
 Stupid, Stupid Man at the National Film and Sound Archive

Australian television sitcoms
TV1 (Australian TV channel) original programming
2006 Australian television series debuts
2008 Australian television series endings
Television shows set in New South Wales
Australian workplace comedy television series